The master of Selwyn College, Cambridge, is the official head of the college and a deputy vice-chancellor of the University of Cambridge. The master of the college is elected by the fellows of Selwyn College, Cambridge, and oversees the direction, development, and promotion of the college. The master of the college is typically selected for significant academic, journalistic, political, or cultural contributions. A master selected by the fellowship uses the title master-elect until installed in the new position, typically at the beginning of the academic year. The current master of the college is the former director of BBC News, Roger Mosey.

History

The college has elected thirteen masters since its founding in 1882. The first master of the college, Arthur Lyttelton (1882–1893), was instrumental in coordinating the establishment of the college and the development of its first court. The second master of the college, John Richardson Selwyn (1893–1898), was a son of the college's namesake, George Augustus Selwyn. Particularly significant or influential masters have been commemorated through the naming of buildings and rooms throughout the college, such as the Owen Chadwick Room. Other masters such as Richard Appleton (1907–1909) have had their initials engraved on the exterior stones of the college's Dining Hall. The master is provided use of the Master Lodge in Old Court for the duration of their term. The Master's Lodge has traditionally served both as the residence of the master as well as a place for college meetings, receptions, and events. Subsequent masters of the college, including Richard Bowring (2000–2013) and Roger Mosey, have continued to lead the college's expansion through the development of new academic and residential buildings.

Masters

Masters of Selwyn College, Cambridge

 1882–1893 Arthur Lyttelton 
 1893–1898 John Richardson Selwyn 
 1898–1907 A. F. Kirkpatrick
 1907–1909 Richard Appleton (academic)
 1909–1928 John Murray
 1928–1934 George Ernest Newsom
 1934–1946 George Armitage Chase 
 1947–1956 William Telfer
 1956–1983 Owen Chadwick
 1983–1993 Sir Alan Cook
 1994–2000 Sir David Harrison
 2000–2013 Richard Bowring
 2013–          Roger Mosey

See also
Selwyn College Library
University of Cambridge
Selwyn College, Cambridge

References

 Selwyn College, Cambridge 1882 – 1973: A Short History

Lists of Masters of Cambridge University colleges
Selwyn College, Cambridge
Selwyn